Wait Field was the original playing surface for Tennessee Volunteers football, at the southeast corner of 15th Street and Cumberland Avenue, currently the site of the Walters Life Science Building. It was also the home venue for Tennessee Volunteers baseball until 1920, when the program moved to Lower Hudson Field.

References

Tennessee Volunteers football
Tennessee Volunteers baseball
Defunct college baseball venues in the United States
Defunct college football venues
Defunct sports venues in Tennessee
Baseball venues in Tennessee
American football venues in Tennessee
1921 disestablishments in Tennessee